Alto del Carmen is a Chilean commune and village in Huasco Province, Atacama Region.

Demographics
According to the 2002 census of the National Statistics Institute, Alto del Carmen had 4,840 inhabitants (2,629 men and 2,211 women), making the commune an entirely rural area. The population grew by 2% (95 persons) between the 1992 and 2002 censuses.

Administration
As a commune, Alto del Carmen is a third-level administrative division of Chile administered by a municipal council, headed by an alcalde who is directly elected every four years.

Within the electoral divisions of Chile, Alto del Carmen is represented in the Chamber of Deputies by Mr. Alberto Robles (PRSD) and Mr. Giovanni Calderón  (UDI) as part of the 6th electoral district, (together with Caldera, Tierra Amarilla, Vallenar, Freirina and Huasco). The commune is represented in the Senate by Isabel Allende Bussi (PS) and Baldo Prokurica Prokurica (RN) as part of the 3rd senatorial constituency (Atacama Region).

References

External links
  Municipality of Alto del Carmen

Communes of Chile
Populated places in Huasco Province